The 2009 Zagorka Cup was a professional tennis tournament played on outdoor red clay courts. It was part of the 2009 ATP Challenger Tour. It took place in Sofia, Bulgaria between 20 and 26 April 2009.

Singles main draw entrants

Seeds

 Rankings are as of April 12, 2009.

Other entrants
The following players received wildcards into the singles main draw:
  Grigor Dimitrov
  Tihomir Grozdanov
  Andreas Haider-Maurer
  Ivo Minář

The following players received entry from the qualifying draw:
  Enrico Burzi
  Konstantinos Economidis
  Rameez Junaid
  Matwé Middelkoop

Champions

Men's singles

 Ivo Minář def.  Florian Mayer, 6–4, 6–3.

Men's doubles

 Dominik Hrbatý /  David Škoch def.  James Auckland /  Peter Luczak, 6–2, 6–4.

References
2009 Draws
ITF search 

Zagorka Cup
Tennis tournaments in Bulgaria
2009 in Bulgarian tennis